The J Award of 2005 is the inaugural annual J Awards, established by the Australian Broadcasting Corporation's youth-focused radio station Triple J. The announcement comes at the culmination of Ausmusic Month (November), on 3 December 2005.
In 2005, there was only one category, Australian Album of the Year.

Background
As part of Triple J's 30th anniversary celebrations in 2005, the station inaugurated a single "J Award" to be given for "an album of outstanding achievement as an Australian musical work of art and for its creativity, innovation, musicianship and contribution to Australian music."

Who's eligible?
Any Australian album released independently or through a record company, or sent to Triple J in consideration for airplay, is eligible for the J Award. The 2005 nominations were selected from albums received by triple j between December 2004 and November 2005.

The criteria
The J Award is for an album of outstanding achievement as an Australian musical work of art - for its creativity, innovation, musicianship and contribution to Australian music. Fifteen nominations were announced throughout the year.

The J Award judging panel is headed by Triple J's Music Director Richard Kingsmill. The panel includes Robbie Buck from Triple J's flagship Australian music program Home and Hosed and other Triple J presenters, producers and live music engineers.

Award
Australian Album of the Year

Richard Kingsmill, Music Director at Triple J and head of the J Award judging panel, said "To put it simply, Wolfmother released the most exciting album of the year. It combines a lot of different influences which sound contemporary, fun and refreshing today. People have paid out on them for being retro. I'd like to remind everyone that Led Zeppelin were criticised early in their career for stealing from blues greats, as were the Rolling Stones, and Dylan was seen as a Woody Guthrie imitator when he started out. So hopefully Wolfmother are also now off to a highly successful career!"

References

2005 in Australian music
2005 music awards
J Awards